Keszthely (also known by other alternative names) is a Hungarian city of 20,895 inhabitants located on the western shore of Lake Balaton. It is the second largest city by the lake and one of the more important cultural, educational and economic hubs in the region. Due to its favorable location and accessibility by both road and rail, Keszthely and the surrounding area is a preferred holiday destination.

Though settled since at least Roman times (the Keszthely culture of the Pannonian Romance language), the first historical evidence of the town Keszthely dates from a 1247 document. Since 1421, Keszthely has been a market town.

The Faculty for Agriculture of University of Pannonia is located in Keszthely. George Fejer, Hungarian author and librarian at the University of Pest, was born in Keszthely in 1766.

Etymology and names

The name comes from Slavic *Kostel, see also the etymology of Kesztölc. Hungarian hely: a site, a location. The Hungarian part of the name could be potentially formed by a phonetic similarity and folk etymology Kesztely→Keszthely. 1247 Kesztel.

Location 

The city of Keszthely is located at the northwest corner of Lake Balaton, on the shore of one of the biggest lakes in Central Europe. The city is surrounded by forests and rolling hills to the north, plains to the south east and the lake. South from the city lies Kis-Balaton (Little Balaton), a swamp which is a part of the Zala river delta and which acts as a natural water purifier for Lake Balaton. The swamp is particularly known as a water fowl habitat and enjoys international recognition and protection as a natural reserve.

The city also enjoys the proximity of Hévíz, a town famous for its spa and health services. Keszthely is very close to some northern Balaton wine regions which are known to produce high quality white wines from locally cultivated varieties.

Keszthely is easily and rather quickly accessible by car from both Budapest, the capital of Hungary, and Vienna, the capital of Austria. Direct bus services between Keszthely and Budapest run several times a day.

Museum

Balaton Museum

The Balaton Museum Association was established in 1898 for among all Sandor Lovassy's initiation. The starting of the museum building in Keszthely was in 1925 with the help of count Taszilo Festetics, on the basis of Györgyi Denes's design in Neo-baroque style. With the building of the first museum in Zala county, the stones from pulled down stables next to Festetics Mannsion were used as well.
The collection shows the archeological, ethnographical, historical and natural scientific values of the Balaton area.

Climate

Twin towns – sister cities

Keszthely is twinned with:

 Alanya, Turkey
 Boppard, Germany
 Hof van Twente, Netherlands
 Jędrzejów, Poland
 Levoča, Slovakia
 Odorheiu Secuiesc, Romania
 Piwniczna-Zdrój, Poland
 Stary Sącz, Poland
 Turnov, Czech Republic

Gallery

See also
Keszthely culture
Keszthely Synagogue

References

External links 

  in Hungarian, English, German and Russian
 Keszthely at Veszprém University 
 Aerial photography: Keszthely
 Keszthely in Flickr
 Keszthely at funiq.hu 
 http://west-balaton.hu/en/keszthely/keszthely-muzeumok/balatoni-muzeum

 
Populated places in Zala County